Below are the squads for the 1978 FIFA World Cup final tournament in Argentina.

Group 1

Argentina

Head coach: César Luis Menotti

Note that this squad is numbered alphabetically by surname, unlike traditional numbering systems where the goalkeeper has shirt number 1 and so forth.

France

Head coach: Michel Hidalgo

Hungary

Head coach: Lajos Baróti

Italy

Head coach: Enzo Bearzot

Note: With the exception of the goalkeepers, who were assigned the traditional shirt numbers for the role (1, 12 and 22) the Italian team was numbered alphabetically within their respective positions – Defenders (from 2 to 8), Midfielders (from 9 to 15), Wingers (16 and 17) and Forwards (from 18 to 21).

Group 2

Mexico
Head coach: José Antonio Roca

Poland
Head coach: Jacek Gmoch

Tunisia
Head coach: Abdelmajid Chetali

West Germany
Head coach: Helmut Schön

Group 3

Austria
Head coach: Helmut Senekowitsch

Brazil
Head coach: Cláudio Coutinho

Spain
Head coach: Ladislao Kubala

Sweden
Head coach: Georg Ericson

Group 4

Iran
Head coach: Heshmat Mohajerani

Netherlands
Head coach:  Ernst Happel

Jan Jongbloed wore number 8 because some of the players who had been in the Dutch squad at the 1974 FIFA World Cup, where the Netherlands used a purely alphabetical numbering system, were given the same numbers again in 1978. Hugo Hovenkamp withdrew from the squad before the tournament began, but after the deadline for naming replacement players had passed. The Netherlands thus went to the World Cup with only 21 players.

Peru
Head coach: Marcos Calderón

Scotland
Manager: Ally MacLeod

Notes
Each national team had to submit a squad of 22 players. All the teams included 3 goalkeepers, except Mexico who only called two.

References

 Planet World Cup website
 weltfussball.de 

Squads
FIFA World Cup squads